For the Summer Olympics, there are 27 venues that have been or will be used for boxing.

References

Venues
 
Box
Boxing-related lists